Šumadija District League is a section of the District Leagues, Serbia's fifth football league. The league is operated by the Football Association of Serbia.

The league consists of 16 clubs from Šumadija District which play each other in a double round-robin league, with each club playing the other club home and away. At the end of the season the top club will be promoted to Dunav Zone League.

2011–12 teams
FK Marjan Knić
FK Šumadinac Natalinci
FK Lokomotiva Lapovo
FK Borac Pajsijevići
FK Bokanja Gorovič
FK Beli Orlovi Brestovac
FK Junkovac
FK Banja
FK Šumadija Toponica
FK Karađorđe Rača
FK Vinča
FK Šumadinac Stojnik
FK Aranđelovac
FK Zabojnica
FK Rača Popović
FK Partizan Darosava

See also
Serbia national football team
Serbian Superliga
Serbian First League
Serbian League
Zone Leagues

5

sr:Зона Дунав у фудбалу